The Elmhirst School was a comprehensive school on the B6100 (Ardsley Road) in Worsbrough Dale, south of Barnsley, South Yorkshire, England.

History
It was the Worsbrough High School, which became known as Elmhirst School in the 1990s. The building before 1952 had been the White Cross School. It became the Barnsley Academy in 2006.

In October 2003, Barnsley Council had decided to close the school in August 2004 and open a new 11-18 school, under the Fresh Start scheme. In February 2004, the council decided to close the school and open an Academy in September 2006 for ages 3–18, including Worsbrough Bank End and Kendray primary schools. It was to be done under Barnsley Council's Remaking Learning project. The Academy would have 420 primary places and 900 secondary places. Funding would come from the Department for Education and Skills, and £2m from the Academy's sponsor, the Church Schools Company (which became the United Church Schools Trust). It was actually sponsored by the United Learning Trust.

Admissions
It admitted ages 11–16 from the Worsbrough and Ardsley areas. More than 50% of pupils were on free school meals. The Ardsley area has a very high teenage pregnancy rate, double the national rate, and much higher than the overall rate for Barnsley.

Academic performance
It was a low performing school, like many schools in Barnsley. From 2000, the schools results virtually halved. It was placed in special measures in 2003, and taken out of this restriction in November 2003. In 2003, its results for exams at 14 were the fifth lowest in England. In the same year, only 9% of pupils got 5 good GCSEs. By 2006, including English and Maths, only 6% of pupils got five good GCSEs including Maths and English. In that same year the school, in March 2006, was lifted from Special Measures into the Notice to Improve category by OFSTED.
The Academy opened in the old building in September 2006.
The Academy moved to its new building on 1 March 2009. In the Summer of 2010 the Academy saw 51% of its students achieve give good GCSEs including Maths and English - it was listed by the Department for Education as the most improved Academy in England.

Alumni

White Cross Secondary School/Worsbrough High School
 Arthur Scargill 1949-53
 Mick McCarthy 1970-74

External links 
 School Homepage
 2000-3 GCSE results
 Proposal for new Academy (pdf)
 EduBase

News items
 Parents opposing the Academy in 2005
 Designing new Academy in November 2004
 Receiving praise in September 2004
 School in one of the worst in England in December 2003

Video clips
 Memories of the former school

Defunct schools in Barnsley
Educational institutions established in 1952
Educational institutions disestablished in 2006
1952 establishments in England
2006 disestablishments in England